.sa is the Latin alphabet Internet country code top-level domain (ccTLD) of Saudi Arabia. Domains of this type can be registered through SaudiNIC, a department of the Communications and Information Technology Commission. The Arabic alphabet ccTLD of Saudi Arabia is السعودية.

History 
The  top-level domain was managed by the King Abdulaziz City for Science and Technology from 1995 to 2006. It was then transferred to Saudi Network Information Center (SaudiNIC).

In December 2021, 82,097  domain names were registered.

Second-level domains 
The second-level domains that are officially open to third-level registrations are:

 : Commercial entities and registered trademarks
 : Educational institutions
 : Elementary and secondary schools
 : Health services (hospitals, clinics, etc.)
 : Governmental entities
 : Internet-related services (ISPs, web hosting, portal sites, etc.)
 : Non-profit organizations
 : Entities or individuals that do not fit in other categories, including personal names.

Internationalized country code TLD
Saudi Arabia was one of the first countries to apply for the new internationalized domain name (IDN) country code top-level domains authorized by the Internet Corporation for Assigned Names and Numbers (ICANN) in 2009. In January 2010, ICANN announced that the Saudi IDN ccTLD (xn--mgberp4a5d4ar, السعودية) one of the first four new IDN ccTLDs to have passed the Fast Track String Evaluation within the domain application process.

See also 
 Saudi Network Information Center
 AlSaudiah

References

External links
 IANA .sa whois information
 Saudi Research & Innovation Network (King Abdulaziz City for Science & Technology)

Computer-related introductions in 1994
Country code top-level domains
Internet in Saudi Arabia

sv:Toppdomän#S